Mina Witkojc (German: Wilhelmine Wittka; 28 May 1893, Burg (Spreewald) – 11 November 1975) was a German journalist, ethnic advocate, and poet. She wrote in the Lower Sorbian language.

Works 
 Dolnoserbske basni, Budyšin 1925
 Wĕnašk błośańskich kwĕtkow, Budyšin 1934
 K swĕtłu a słyńcu, Berlin 1955
 Prĕdne kłoski, Berlin 1958
 Po drogach casnikarki, Budyšin 1987

References

External links 
 Mina Witkojc, literaturport.de

1893 births
1975 deaths
People from Spree-Neiße
People from the Province of Brandenburg
Sorbian-language writers
Writers from Brandenburg
German women poets
20th-century German poets
20th-century German women writers